Lea-Marie Becker (born 9 July 1992), known professionally as Lea (stylized as LEA), is a German singer-songwriter and keyboardist.

Life and career 
Lea is the daughter of a music therapist. When she was 15, she began releasing videos on YouTube, under her first name Lea-Marie. Her song Wo ist die Liebe hin was viewed more than 2.7 million times. She studied music and special education in Hannover.

Her version of Hildegard Knef's So hat alles seinen Sinn was included in the compilation album Für Hilde in 2015, leading to the record label Four Music publishing her debut album Vakuum in 2016. In it she handled her first relationship and the feeling of not knowing where home is.

Her songs describe themes of love, friendship, and loneliness. Many of her songs are internal monologues, in which she asks herself questions that often remain unanswered.

In 2017, she went on her first tour, along with Frederic Michel (percussion) and Hannes Porombka (guitar and synthesizer). She also performed at the Early Spring Singer Songwriter Festival in Saalfelden.

Also in 2017, a remix of Wohin willst du?, in collaboration with Gestört aber GeiL, reached 11th place in the German single charts, along with 43rd place in the Austrian charts. She also wrote Be My Now with Gestört aber GeiL, which was used as the title song of the eighth season of the German version of The Bachelor. It is in English while all of her other songs are written in German.

In August 2018, she released the song Immer wenn wir uns sehn, written in collaboration with actor  for the film Das schönste Mädchen der Welt. In September 2019, she released 110, a collaboration with Capital Bra and Samra, which reached the top place in the German charts.

Lea was a participant in the 7th season of Sing meinen Song – Das Tauschkonzert.

She lived in Hannover until 2018. Since 2018, she has lived in Berlin.

Discography

Albums

Singles

Awards and nominations

Results

References

External links 
 Official website
 
 

1992 births
German women singer-songwriters
German women pianists
21st-century German women singers
Living people
21st-century women pianists